The 2019 AFC Cup group stage was played from 25 February to 26 June 2019. A total of 36 teams competed in the group stage to decide the 11 places in the knockout stage of the 2019 AFC Cup.

Draw

The draw for the group stage was held on 22 November 2018, 14:00 MYT (UTC+8), at the AFC House in Kuala Lumpur, Malaysia. The 36 teams were drawn into nine groups of four: three groups each in the West Asia Zone (Groups A–C) and the ASEAN Zone (Groups F–H), and one group each in the Central Asia Zone (Group D), the South Asia Zone (Group E), and the East Asia Zone (Group I). Teams from the same association in the West Asia Zone and ASEAN Zone could not be drawn into the same group.

The mechanism of the draw was as follows:
For the West Asia Zone, a draw was held for the five associations with two direct entrants (Syria, Jordan, Kuwait, Bahrain, Lebanon) to determine the order of associations occupying the following group positions (higher-seeded team of each association allocated to first position, lower-seeded team of each association allocated to second position): A1 and B2, B1 and C2, C1 and A2, A3 and B4, B3 and C4. The direct entrant from Oman and the play-off winners were allocated to positions C3 and A4 respectively.
For the ASEAN Zone, a draw was held for the five associations with two direct entrants (Vietnam, Philippines, Singapore, Indonesia, Myanmar) to determine the order of associations occupying the following group positions (higher-seeded team of each association allocated to first position, lower-seeded team of each association allocated to second position): F1 and G2, G1 and H2, H1 and F2, F3 and G4, G3 and H4. The direct entrants from Laos and Cambodia were allocated to positions H3 and F4 respectively.
For the Central Asia Zone, the South Asia Zone, and the East Asia Zone, no draw was held. The direct entrants were allocated to group positions 1, 2 and 3 according to their association ranking (Central Asia Zone: Tajikistan, Turkmenistan, Kyrgyzstan; South Asia Zone: India, Bangladesh, Nepal; East Asia Zone: Hong Kong, North Korea, Chinese Taipei), and the play-off winners were allocated to group positions 4.

The following 36 teams entered into the group stage draw, which included the 32 direct entrants and the four winners of the play-off round of the qualifying play-offs, whose identity was not known at the time of the draw.

Standby teams
 Al-Faisaly (for Al-Wehdat)
 Kazma (for Al-Kuwait)
 Regar-TadAZ (for Istiklol)
 Davao Aguilas (for Ceres–Negros)
 Bhayangkara (for Persija Jakarta)
 Zwekapin United (for Yangon United)
 Pegasus (for Kitchee)

Format

In the group stage, each group was played on a home-and-away round-robin basis. The following teams advanced to the knockout stage:
The winners of each group and the best runners-up in the West Asia Zone and the ASEAN Zone advanced to the Zonal semi-finals.
The winners of each group in the Central Asia Zone, the South Asia Zone, and the East Asia Zone advanced to the Inter-zone play-off semi-finals.

In the event that a group contains only three teams, it might be played on a double round-robin basis hosted by two of the teams if at least two of the three teams agree to this format (Regulations Article 10.1.7).

Tiebreakers

The teams were ranked according to points (3 points for a win, 1 point for a draw, 0 points for a loss). If tied on points, tiebreakers were applied in the following order (Regulations Article 10.5):
Points in head-to-head matches among tied teams;
Goal difference in head-to-head matches among tied teams;
Goals scored in head-to-head matches among tied teams;
Away goals scored in head-to-head matches among tied teams;
If more than two teams were tied, and after applying all head-to-head criteria above, a subset of teams were still tied, all head-to-head criteria above were reapplied exclusively to this subset of teams;
Goal difference in all group matches;
Goals scored in all group matches;
Penalty shoot-out if only two teams playing each other in the last round of the group were tied;
Disciplinary points (yellow card = 1 point, red card as a result of two yellow cards = 3 points, direct red card = 3 points, yellow card followed by direct red card = 4 points);
Association ranking.

Schedule
The schedule of each matchday is as follows (W: West Asia Zone; C: Central Asia Zone; S: South Asia Zone; A: ASEAN Zone; E: East Asia Zone).
Matches in the West Asia Zone were played on Mondays and Tuesdays. One or two groups were played on each day, with the following groups played on Mondays:
Matchdays 1 and 2: Groups A and B
Matchday 3: Groups A and C
Matchday 4: Group B
Matchdays 5 and 6: Group C
Matches in the ASEAN Zone were played on Tuesdays and Wednesdays. One or two groups were played on each day, with the following groups played on Tuesdays:
Matchdays 1 and 2: Groups F and G
Matchday 3: Groups F and H
Matchday 4: Group G
Matchdays 5 and 6: Group H
Matches in the Central Asia Zone, the South Asia Zone, and the East Asia Zone were played on Wednesdays. If two teams from the same association were scheduled to play at home on the same matchday, the home match of the lower-seeded team was moved to Tuesday.

Groups

Group A

Group B

Group C

Group D

Group E

Group F

Group G

Group H

Group I

Ranking of second-placed teams

West Asia Zone

ASEAN Zone

Notes

References

External links
, the-AFC.com
AFC Cup 2019, stats.the-AFC.com

2
February 2019 sports events in Asia
March 2019 sports events in Asia
April 2019 sports events in Asia
May 2019 sports events in Asia